Eduard Streltsov Stadium, also known as the Torpedo Stadium, is a multi-purpose stadium in Moscow, Russia.  It is currently used mostly for football matches and is the home ground of Torpedo Moscow. First built in 1959, the stadium now holds 13,450 people.

Since 1996, the stadium is named after Eduard Streltsov, a former Torpedo Moscow player and one of the most iconic Soviet footballers. Despite not being directly owned by the club, the stadium is often referred to as the "Torpedo Stadium", and it was formally re-registered as such in 2018. 

The stadium was demolished in 2022 and will be rebuilt. At its expected completion in 2024, it will hold 15,076 people.

The new stadium is designed by the two architects Michel REMON and Alexis PEYER from the French office MR&A.

References

Sports venues completed in 1959
Football venues in Russia
Sports venues in Moscow
Sports venues built in the Soviet Union
FC Moscow
FC Torpedo Moscow
Multi-purpose stadiums in Russia
1959 establishments in Russia